Hurtling Through is a joint effort EP /mini-album by Hollie Fullbrook, Tiny Ruins, and Hamish Kilgour of The Clean.

Background
In 2013, Hollie Fullbrook met Hamish Kilgour in New York City and they did some shows together. On the final day of their string of shows, they recorded two tracks with producer Gary Olson in a basement studio. That was the start of it. The following year, Fullbrook went back to the States and she and Kilgour recorded more tracks.

Songs from the album were performed live in March 2016 for Radio New Zealand by Fullbrook, Kilgour, Zac Arnold,  and Gary Hunt.

Reviews
Reviewer Anne Toller of the Sydney Morning Herald The album has hints of a British folk revival sound, and of raga, with drumming by Kilgour pushing the style of Hollie Fullbrook into a folk psych direction.

Releases

Musicians
 Hollie Fullbrook - Acoustic Guitar, Electric Guitar, Vocals, Cello, Organ, Dulcimer
 Hamish Kilgour - Drums, Percussion, Wind Chimes, Jew's Harp, Harmonica, Shaker, Guiro, Tambourine, Tabla, Spoons
 Danny Tunick - Bass (tracks: A3, B2), Vibraphone
 Greg Vegas - Saxophone 
 (Uncredited) - Cello
Production
 Chris Chetland - Mastering
 Gary Olson - Mixing, Production, Recording
 Hollie Fullbrook  - Production
 Hamish Kilgour  - Production

References

2015 albums